Busselton is the central suburb of the city of Busselton in Western Australia's South West region. At the 2021 census, it had a population of 1,838.

References

Suburbs of Busselton